DZEA-TV (channel 10) is a television station in Tuba, Benguet, Philippines, airing programming from the GMA network. Owned and operated by the network's namesake corporate parent, the station maintains studios at the GMA Complex, Claveria Road, Malued District, Dagupan, Pangasinan, while its transmitter facilities shared with GTV outlet DWDG-TV channel 22 are located atop Mount Santo Tomas.

History 
1980 - GMA started its broadcast in Benguet via Channel 10, which then used by ABS-CBN prior to its closure after the declaration of Martial law in the Philippines eight years ago, together with the network's own variation of GMA Radio-Television Arts ident aside from sporting a light blue square logo with the network name in white, also had a circle 10 logo in use, in its final years the blue circle 10 logo used was similar to those used by the ABC is some United States cities and later used the rainbow colors of red, yellow, green and blue stripes.
April 30, 1992 - Coinciding with the network's Rainbow Satellite Network launch, GMA Channel 10 Baguio started its nationwide satellite broadcast to bring live broadcasts of Manila-sourced national programming via DZBB-TV, GMA's flagship TV station in Manila, to viewers in North Luzon region, with the utilizes a new logo to correspond with the rebranding and a satellite-beaming rainbow in a multicolored striped based on the traditional scheme of red, orange, yellow, green, blue, indigo and violet, with GMA in a metallic form uses a San Serif Country Gothic Extra Bold and analogous gloominess of Indigo as its fonts in the letters.
2005 - GMA Network launched TV-10 Dagupan as a satellite station in Pangasinan, with the opening of its studios located in Claveria Road, Malued District, Dagupan and the inauguration of a 20,000-watt transmitter facility located in Mt. Sto Tomas, Tuba, Benguet, resulting in improved signal quality throughout North Luzon and at the same year, QTV Channel 38 was also launched in Dagupan which is now currently carries GMA News TV (now inactive).
2008 - GMA Dagupan was upgraded to a "superstation" and it was alternately branded as GMA North Central Luzon, which primarily covers the provinces of Pangasinan, Nueva Ecija, Tarlac, La Union and Benguet including Baguio; and can also be seen on the provinces of Zambales, Aurora, Ifugao, and Mountain Province. On May 5 of the same year, the station launched its flagship local newscast Balitang Amianan.
April 27, 2009 - GMA Dagupan launched its local morning show Primera Balita.
October 22, 2010 – 2011 - GMA News and Public Affairs Dagupan launched Isyu Ngayon North Central Luzon, a one-hour weekly public affairs show on the most pressing topics and issues around Pangasinan and Benguet.
November 10, 2014 - GMA News and Public Affairs Dagupan relaunched Balitang Amianan as 24 Oras North Central Luzon.
April 24, 2015 - Primera Balita aired its final episode, following the strategic streamlining undertaken on the provincial stations of GMA Network.
August 31, 2015 - GMA News and Public Affairs Dagupan relaunched 24 Oras North Central Luzon as 24 Oras Amianan.
February 1, 2016 - September 2, 2022 - Balitang Amianan returned on the air after more than a year hiatus and usage of the 24 Oras brand.
October 3, 2016 - Balitang Amianan began its simulcast on GMA Ilocos, which is composed of TV-5 Ilocos Norte, TV-48 Ilocos Sur, TV-7 Abra, and TV-5 Mountain Province.
May 2018 - GMA North Central Luzon started digital test broadcasts on UHF 38 covering Dagupan, Baguio and the provinces of Benguet, Pangasinan, Tarlac and La Union, as well as several parts of Zambales, Ifugao, Mountain Province and Nueva Ecija.
March 15, 2021 - Balitang Amianan expands its simulcast on TV-7 Batanes, TV-7 Tuguegarao, TV-13 Aparri, TV-7 Isabela, TV-5 Baler and TV-10 Olongapo.
September 5, 2022 - GMA North Central Luzon relaunched One North Central Luzon.

GMA TV-10 Dagupan programs 
Mornings with GMA Regional TV - flagship morning newscast
One North Central Luzon - flagship afternoon newscast
Panagbenga Festival - every February
Word of God Network

GMA TV-10 Dagupan former programs
Balitang Amianan
24 Oras Amianan
24 Oras North Central Luzon
Istayl Natin
Isyu Ngayon North and Central Luzon - public affairs and investigative news
Let's Fiesta
Primera Balita 
The Amianan Agenda (special programming for 2010 elections)
Visita Iglesia

Personalities

Present 
CJ Torida as Anchor and Senior Desk Manager of One North Central Luzon.
Joanne Ponsoy as Co-anchor and News Producer of One North Central Luzon, Co-host of Mornings with GMA Regional TV and National Anchor of GMA Regional TV News.
Jasmin Gabriel-Galban as News Correspondent of One North Central Luzon.
Russel Simorio as News Correspondent of One North Central Luzon.
Claire Lacanilao as News Correspondent of One North Central Luzon.
Jerick James Pasiliao as Supervising Producer of One North Central Luzon.
Harold Reyes as Host of Mornings with GMA Regional TV and Co-anchor of One North Central Luzon.

Past 
 Jorge Guererro
 Joyce Segui 
 Faye Centeno
 Jessica Manwi-it† – (died in June 2016)
 Charmaine Alvarado 
 Lilian Bautista-Tiburcio 
 Mike Sabado
 Hazel Cawaing
 Mina Gutierrez
 Jeeson Alamar
 Peha Lagao
 Charisse Victorio
 Shiela Mae Finuliar
 Cynthia Mae Velasco
 Anthony Ron Allister "Ka Tonying" Tañedo a.k.a. Araguy - Trivia ni Araguy segment host
 Michael Sison
 Jette Arcellana – (now a lawyer)
 Alfie Tulagan
 Kim Bandarlipe (Political Run For 2022 Elections) – Now a municipal councilor
 King Guevarra
 Ara Hanesh (now in the United States)
 Maureen Dalope-Galapon – former Program Manager
 Marjorie Padua – Supervising Producer, now with Balitang Southern Tagalog as the Senior Program Manager-in-Charge of Production
 Trace Justine De Leon – Supervising Producer
 Dennis Alipio – Ilocos Norte correspondent; formerly with the now-defunct 24 Oras Ilokano
 Argie Lorenzo – Abra correspondent; formerly with the now-defunct 24 Oras, now with 103.7 Joy FM Abra
 Vic Alhambra – La Union correspondent
 Junjun Sy – Nueva Ecija correspondent
 Ronald Leander – Aurora correspondent

Rebroadcasters

Since October 3, 2016, the operations of GMA Ilocos (TV-5 Ilocos Norte, TV-7 Abra, TV-48 Ilocos Sur and TV-5 Mountain Province) was absorbed by the Dagupan station which led to simulcast Balitang Amianan and other regional interstitials, as well as some of the editorial and reportorial staff that are employed by the latter. GMA Ilocos were previously an originating station from 2012 to 2015, with its former flagship newscasts Balitang Ilokano and 24 Oras Ilokano. GMA Dagupan also reaches Pampanga and Nueva Vizcaya where it received signals when TV-10 Pampanga and TV-5 Bayombong (both former stations) are currently inactive. TV-7 Batanes, TV-7 Tuguegarao, TV-13 Aparri, TV-7 Isabela, TV-5 Baler and TV-10 Olongapo were former relay stations of GMA-7 Manila before being reassigned to GMA Dagupan on March 15, 2021.

Digital television

Digital channels
UHF Channel 38 (617.143 MHz)

Area of coverage

Primary areas 
 Baguio 
 Benguet
 Pangasinan
 Dagupan
 La Union

Secondary areas 
 Nueva Ecija
 Tarlac
 Parts of Mountain Province
 Parts of Nueva Vizcaya
 Southern Portion of Ilocos Sur
 Parts of Bataan
 Parts of Bulacan
Parts of Aurora
 Parts of Pampanga (including San Fernando City)
 Northern Portion of Zambales

References

See also 
DWTL
List of GMA Network stations

Digital television stations in the Philippines
GMA Network stations
Television stations in Baguio
Television stations in Pangasinan
Television channels and stations established in 1980